Karma Tsewang (born 1 October 1988) is a professional footballer who last played for Gangtok Himalayan SC as a midfielder. Born in India, he represents the Tibet national team.

Career

Viva Kerala
Karma Tsewang was passionate about football from his childhood and is extremely grateful to the support and encouragement that he gets from his family, which comprises his parents, three brothers and four sisters. It was in fact in one such tournament when a Viva Kerala (later known as Chirag United Club Kerala) scout noticed Karma’s skill and ability, which earned him a place in the side in 2008. Soon he became an integral member of the Viva kerala side, where he played mostly as a right winger for two seasons. His skills and touch along with his unselfish attitude soon earned him the plaudits he deserved. His versatility helped add another dimension to his game as the youngster can play across the midfield as a central midfielder or on either of the wings.

Pune
Karma Tsewang signed for Pune FC at the start of the 2011–12 I-League season. He soon broke into the first team and made the right wing his own displaying some spectacular performances throughout the season.

Salgaocar
Tsewang made his debut for Salgaocar in the I-League on 21 September 2013 against reigning champions Churchill Brothers at the Duler Stadium in which he came on as a substitute for Claude Gnakpa in 59th minute; as Salgaocar drew the match 1–1.

Career statistics

References

External links
 Karma Tsewang Profile at Goal.com
 Karma Tsewang at soccermanager.com

Indian footballers
Tibetan footballers
Tibet international footballers
Living people
1988 births
I-League players
Chirag United Club Kerala players
Pune FC players
Salgaocar FC players
Footballers from Karnataka
People from Chamarajanagar district
Indian people of Tibetan descent
Association football midfielders